The Review of Contemporary Fiction is a tri-quarterly journal published by Dalkey Archive Press. It features a variety of fiction, reviews and critical essays on literature that has an experimental, avant-garde or subversive bent. Founded in 1980 by the publisher John O'Brien, The Review of Contemporary Fiction originally focused upon American and British writers who had been overlooked by the critical establishment, and in this manner the Review succeeded in bringing new critical attention to writers such as William Gaddis, Gilbert Sorrentino, Paul Metcalf, Nicholas Mosley, Donald Barthelme, and many others. In 1984, in order to begin reprinting some of these authors, John O'Brien founded Dalkey Archive Press.

Over the past few decades, both the Review and Dalkey Archive have widened their focus to include works in translation, especially from countries without a strong presence in global literature. Examples of significant international issues of the Review include Slovak Fiction (30.2), New Catalan Fiction (28.1), and New Latvian Fiction (18.1). The next upcoming issue of the Review will be on Moldovan Fiction.

The Review has featured essays and reviews from some of the most well-known writers of today, including Jonathan Franzen, David Foster Wallace, Jonathan Safran Foer, Kathy Acker, Barbara Guest and Jonathan Lethem. At the center of the Review is the notion that authors should write about other authors, instead of leaving it to critics or academics. When asked why he started the Review of Contemporary Fiction, John O'Brien responded:

Significant contributors to the Review include:

 Kathy Acker
 Diane Ackerman
 John Ashbery
 John Barth
 S. D. Chrostowska
 Robert Coover
 Robert Creeley
 Guy Davenport
 Helen DeWitt
 Rikki Ducornet
 Stanley Elkin
 Jonathan Safran Foer
 Jonathan Franzen
 William Gass
 Barbara Guest
 Dermot Healy
 Aidan Higgins
 Travis Jeppesen
 Kenneth Koch
 Milan Kundera
 Jonathan Lethem
 David Markson
 Paul Metcalf
 China Miéville
 Patrick Modiano
 Steven Moore
 Nicholas Mosley
 Ann Pancake
 Marjorie Perloff
 Robert Pinget
 John Rechy
 Alain Robbe-Grillet
 Hubert Selby
 Michael Silverblatt
 Gilbert Sorrentino
 William T. Vollmann
 Kurt Vonnegut
 David Foster Wallace
 Curtis White
 John E. Woods

References

Literary magazines published in the United States
Triannual journals